Vector Pipeline L.P. is a 348-mile-long natural gas pipeline which transports approximately  per day of natural gas from Joliet, Illinois, in the Chicago area, to parts of Indiana and Michigan and into Ontario, Canada. The pipeline is important in the supply and transportation of natural gas from the United States and Western Canada to the Midwest, eastern Canada and the northeastern United States, supplying power generation plants, natural gas distribution companies, and natural gas storage facilities. The pipeline also has interconnections with several other natural gas pipelines along its route.

Vector Pipeline L.P. is a joint venture between Calgary-based Enbridge Inc. and Detroit-based DTE Energy Company(). Vector Pipeline filed applications with the U.S. Federal Energy Regulatory Commission and the Canadian National Energy Board in late 1997. Construction of the pipeline took place during 2000 and Vector began operations Dec. 1, 2000. Its FERC code is 175. Duke Energy acquired a 30% stake in the pipeline in 2002 when it bought Westcoast Energy Inc.; it sold its interest in September 2003 to DTE and Enbridge, who already owned the other 70%, for $145 million. Enbridge provides operating services to Vector and owns a 60% stake.

References

External links
Pipeline Electronic Bulletin Board

Natural gas pipelines in the United States
Natural gas pipelines in Canada
Enbridge pipelines
DTE Energy
2000 establishments in the United States
2000 establishments in Canada
Canada–United States relations
Transport buildings and structures in Ontario
Natural gas pipelines in Illinois
Natural gas pipelines in Indiana
Natural gas pipelines in Michigan